{|
{{Infobox ship image
|Ship image=The train ferry Manistique-Marquette & Northern No. 1 underway.jpg 
|Ship caption=The Milwaukee when she was named Manistique-Marquette & Northern No. 1}}

|}
SS Milwaukee was a train ferry that served on Lake Michigan.  It was launched in 1902 and sank with all hands off Milwaukee on October 22, 1929.  Fifty-two men were lost with the vessel.

Ship history
The ship was built by the American Ship Building Company of Cleveland, Ohio, and launched on December 6, 1902. Initially owned by the Manistique-Marquette & Northern Railroad Company of Manistique, Michigan, she was operated under the name Manistique-Marquette & Northern No. 1 until 1909, when she was bought by the Grand Trunk Milwaukee Car Ferry Company and renamed Milwaukee.

The Milwaukee shuttled railroad cars back and forth from Milwaukee to the Grand Trunk Railway's dock in Grand Haven in western Michigan.  This route enabled shippers to avoid the crowded railroad yards and sidings of Chicago.  The Milwaukee was home-ported in the city for which it was named.  The docks of the Grand Trunk Milwaukee Car Ferry Company were located on the Kinnickinnic River, and their ferries were familiar sights to residents of Jones Island.

Sinking
Around 2:00 pm on October 22, 1929, the Milwaukee sailed off on Lake Michigan into a storm bound for Grand Haven, and was lost.   The Milwaukee had been loaded earlier that day with 27 railcars, with freight including lumber, perishable foods, bathtubs and Nash automobiles.  The Milwaukee was last seen passing by U.S. Lightship 95 (LV-95/WAL-519), a ship anchored three miles offshore, serving as a lighthouse.  The Milwaukee was reported to be pitching and rolling heavily as it disappeared into the rainy mist.  The ship did not have radio equipment. 

It was considered routine for the Milwaukee to challenge stormy weather on Lake Michigan.  This time, however, some of the 27 railroad cars in the ship's hold came loose in the  gale.  Their momentum created metal failure and partly crumpled the ferry’s sea gate, a movable steel shield that, when operating properly, served as part of the vessel’s freeboard.  This failure, in turn, enabled water to come in through the stern and sink the ship.  The captain, Robert H. McKay, apparently turned back for Milwaukee, but never made it.

On October 24, aircraft searched Lake Michigan, but found nothing.

Some of the lifeboats were launched by the crew, and the bodies of two crew members wearing SS Milwaukee lifejackets were picked up two days later by the steamer, SS Steel Chemist, off Kenosha, Wisconsin, and two more, including the body of Captain McKay, were found by the coast guard at Kenosha later that day. A lifeboat containing four dead crew members was found on 26 October floating near Holland, Michigan, on the other side of the lake. That lifeboat is now located at the 1860 Light Station and Museum in Port Washington, Wisconsin and is on display as permanent museum exhibit.

On October 27, an empty lifeboat was found floating near Grand Haven, Michigan. On further investigation, it was found that the ship's message case was floating nearby with an apparent final message: "Oct. 22, 1929. 8:30 pm. The ship is making water fast. We have turned around and headed for Milwaukee. Pumps are working, but sea gate is bent in and can't keep the water out. Flicker is flooded. Seas are tremendous. Things look bad. Crew roll is about the same as last payday. A.R. Sadon, Purser."

Another note, found in a bottle, read: "This is the worst storm I have ever seen.  Can't stay up much longer.  Hole in side of boat."

All 52 people on board were lost, while 15 bodies were recovered.  The watch on one of those crew members was stopped at 9:35.    As the years passed, interest in the circumstances around the loss of the ship was occasionally rekindled.  For example, the story was retold by marine historian Dwight Boyer in his Ghost Ships of the Great Lakes in 1968.

City of Milwaukee
As a result of the loss of SS Milwaukee, the Grand Trunk needed a new train ferry. The replacement vessel is now a museum ship and National Historic Landmark.

The train ferry rediscovered

In March 2006, the  History Channel television program Deep Sea Detectives premiered an episode entitled "Train Wreck in Lake Michigan", which profiled the loss of the Milwaukee'' through historical documents, interviews with historians and dives to the wreck itself. The show highlighted the fact that there were missing hatch covers between the track deck and compartments below, including the engine room and the crew quarters (Flicker), that probably allowed those areas to become flooded and thus contributed to the sinking of the ship.

References

External links

 Car Ferry Milwaukee Wreck Photos
 SS Milwaukee Historic Marker Information

1902 ships
Ships built in Cleveland
Train ferries
Ferries of Michigan
Ferries of Wisconsin
Great Lakes ships
Transportation in Milwaukee
Shipwrecks of Lake Michigan
Maritime incidents in 1929
Ships lost with all hands
Shipwreck discoveries by John Steele
Passenger ships of the Great Lakes